Antioch, also known as Hilton, is an unincorporated community in Covington County, Alabama, United States.

History
The community was originally called Hilton, then the name was changed to Antioch. The community was likely named after the local Antioch Church, which was in turn named for the ancient city. A post office operated under the name Hilton from 1882 to 1904.

Demographics
According to the returns from 1850-2010 for Alabama, it has never reported a population figure separately on the U.S. Census.

References

Unincorporated communities in Covington County, Alabama
Unincorporated communities in Alabama